Bantz is a surname. Notable people with the surname include:

 Fred A. Bantz (1895–1982), American official in the United States Department of the Navy
 Helmut Bantz (1921–2004), German gymnast and Olympic champion
 Brandon Bantz (born 1987), American baseball catcher 
 Jeffri W. Bantz (1954–2006), American classical conductor and teacher
 Bantz John Craddock (born 1949), United States Army general

Surnames